"From each according to his ability, to each according to his needs" is a slogan popularised by Karl Marx in his 1875 Critique of the Gotha Programme. The principle refers to free access to and distribution of goods, capital and services. In the Marxist view, such an arrangement will be made possible by the abundance of goods and services that a developed communist system will be capable to produce; the idea is that, with the full development of socialism and unfettered productive forces, there will be enough to satisfy everyone's needs.

Origin of the phrase 
The complete paragraph containing Marx's statement of the creed in the Critique of the Gotha Programme is as follows:

Although Marx is popularly thought of as the originator of the phrase, the slogan was common within the socialist movement. For example, August Becker in 1844 described it as the basic principle of communism and Louis Blanc used it in 1851. The French socialist Saint-Simonists of the 1820s and 1830s used slightly different slogans such as "from each according to his ability, to each ability according to its work" or "from each according to his capacity, to each according to his works.” The origin of this phrasing has also been attributed to the French utopian Étienne-Gabriel Morelly, who proposed in his 1755 Code of Nature "Sacred and Fundamental Laws that would tear out the roots of vice and of all the evils of a society", including:

A similar phrase can be found in the Guilford Covenant in 1639:

Some scholars trace the phrase to the New Testament. In Acts of the Apostles the lifestyle of the community of believers in Jerusalem is described as communal (without individual possession), and uses the phrase "distribution was made unto every man according as he had need":

Other scholars find its origins in "the Roman legal concept of obligation in solidum", in which "everyone assumes responsibility for anyone who cannot pay his debt, and he is conversely responsible for everyone else". James Furner argues:
If  = a disadvantage, and  = action to redress that disadvantage, the principle of solidarity is: if any member of a group acquires , each member has a duty to perform  (if they can assist). All we then need to add, to get to the fundamental principle of developed communism, is to assume that non-satisfaction of a need is a disadvantage. The corresponding principle of solidarity in respect of need says: if any member of society has an unsatisfied need, each member has a duty to produce its object (if they can). But that is precisely what the principle 'from each according to their abilities, to each according to their needs!' dictates. In Marx's vision, the basic principle of developed communism is a principle of solidarity in respect of need.

Debates on the idea 
Marx delineated the specific conditions under which such a creed would be applicable—a society where technology and social organization had substantially eliminated the need for physical labor in the production of things, where "labor has become not only a means of life but life's prime want". Marx explained his belief that, in such a society, each person would be motivated to work for the good of society despite the absence of a social mechanism compelling them to work, because work would have become a pleasurable and creative activity. Marx intended the initial part of his slogan, "from each according to his ability" to suggest not merely that each person should work as hard as they can, but that each person should best develop their particular talents.

Claiming themselves to be at a "lower stage of communism" (i.e. "socialism", in line with Vladimir Lenin’s terminology), the Soviet Union adapted the formula as: "From each according to his ability, to each according to his work (labour investment)". This was incorporated in Article 12 of the 1936 Constitution of the Soviet Union, but described by Leon Trotsky as an "inwardly contradictory, not to say nonsensical, formula".

See also 

 Tragedy of the commons
 Anarchist communism
 Acts 2:44
 Acts 4:32
 Communism
 Equality of outcome
 He who does not work, neither shall he eat
 Jedem das Seine
 Justice
 Post-scarcity economy
 Parasitism (social offense)
 Suum cuique
 To each according to his contribution
 Workers of the world, unite!
 Seven deadly sins
 Sloth (deadly sin)

References

Bibliography

Further reading

External links 
 Critique of the Gotha Program (includes Marx's original use of the slogan)
 Marxism and Ethics
 Encountering Communism: the theories of Karl Marx

Marxism
Communism
Political catchphrases
Acts of the Apostles
Ethical principles